Iron Horse is a bluegrass band from Killen, Alabama, US. They are known for performing and recording bluegrass cover versions of rock songs, particularly their bluegrass treatments of heavy metal songs popularized by Metallica. The band has two tracks on the tribute album Strummin' with the Devil: The Southern Side of Van Halen, which also features David Lee Roth, among other artists. They have recently been working on self-produced material and in October 2009 released an all-original Christmas project called "Small Town Christmas".

Members
 Vance Henry: guitar, lead and tenor vocals
 Anthony Richardson: banjo, baritone and bass vocals
 Ricky Rogers: bassist, baritone and lead vocals
 Tony Robertson: mandolin, lead and tenor vocals

Discography

Tribute albums
 2003 – Fade to Bluegrass: The Bluegrass Tribute to Metallica
 2004 – Black and Bluegrass: A Tribute to Ozzy Osbourne and Black Sabbath
 2004 – Pickin' on Modest Mouse
 2005 – Whole Lotta Bluegrass: A Bluegrass Tribute to Led Zeppelin
 2006 – Fade to Bluegrass: The Bluegrass Tribute to Metallica, Vol. 2
 2006 – Life, Birth, Blue, Grass: A Bluegrass Tribute to Black Label Society
 2006 – Strummin' With The Devil: The Southern Side of Van Halen (two tracks on a multi-artist compilation)
 2007 – The Bluegrass Tribute to The Shins
 2007 – Take Me Home: The Bluegrass Tribute to Guns N' Roses	
 2007 – The Bluegrass Tribute to Classic Rock (featuring 7 songs by Iron Horse and 7 songs by Corn Bread Red)
 2007 – The Bluegrass Tribute to Modest Mouse: Something You've Never Heard Before
 2007 – The Gospel According to Hank Williams
 2009 – A Boy Named Blue: A Bluegrass Tribute to Goo Goo Dolls
 2010 – The Bluegrass Tribute to Kings of Leon
 2010 – "The Bluegrass Tribute to Kanye West's Heartless" (single)
 2017 – Pickin' On Nirvana

Original material/Self Produced

 2001 – Ridin' Out The Storm
 2005 – New Tracks
 2009 – Small Town Christmas (new, all original Christmas songs)
 2010 – "Reba McEntire" (single)
 2011 – Horse & Pen
 2018 - "Classic Bluegrass Vol 1"
 2020 - "Classic Bluegrass Vol 2"

References

Bibliography
Bozeman, Bobby.  Bluegrass focus of Rogersville festival. TimesDaily, 19 April 2012.
Palmer, Robert. Jake Landers benefit show to be staged at the Ritz TimesDaily, 15 October 2012.

External links
 Iron Horse Bluegrass - Official Band Website
 

American bluegrass music groups
Musical groups established in 2000
People from Killen, Alabama